Unge lovende (English: Young and Promising) is a Norwegian dramedy that aired for 4 seasons on NRK1.  The plot follows three twenty-something Norwegian women; it has been called the Norwegian Girls. It has won several professional awards at the Gullruten. Its British TV rights are owned by Channel 4 and Australian by SBS.

References

NRK original programming
2015 Norwegian television series debuts
2010s Norwegian television series